Mesalina microlepis, also known as the small-scaled desert lizard, is a species of sand-dwelling lizard in the family Lacertidae. It occurs in Syria, Lebanon, Egypt, Israel, Jordan, Iraq, and Iran.

References

microlepis
Reptiles described in 1936
Taxa named by Fernand Angel